This list of botanical gardens and arboretums in Rhode Island is intended to include all the significant botanical gardens and arboretums in the U.S. state of Rhode Island.

See also
List of botanical gardens and arboretums in the United States

References 

 
Arboreta in Rhode Island
botanical gardens and arboretums in Rhode Island